Major Alexander Henry Louis Hardinge, 2nd Baron Hardinge of Penshurst,  (17 May 189429 May 1960) was Private Secretary to the Sovereign during the Abdication Crisis of Edward VIII and during most of the Second World War.

Background and earlier life
Hardinge was born in 1894, the son of Charles Hardinge (who was created Baron Hardinge of Penshurst in 1910 and served as Viceroy of India from 1910 to 1916).

Hardinge was educated at Harrow School and Trinity College, Cambridge.

He was commissioned into the Grenadier Guards and fought in the First World War and became a Lieutenant and received the Military Cross. He was Aide-de-Camp to the Viceroy of India between 1915 and 1916. In 1920, he became Assistant Private Secretary to George V and was promoted Captain. On 8 February 1921, he married Helen Gascoyne-Cecil (a daughter of Lord Edward Gascoyne-Cecil) and they had three children. In 1929 he was promoted Major.

Hardinge served as Assistant Private Secretary up until George V's death in January 1936.

Private Secretary to Edward VIII and George VI
He was promoted to Private Secretary upon the accession of Edward VIII that same year, contributing to some delicate negotiations between the new king and the British government in the run up to the king's abdication in December 1936; he continued in this role under George VI until his early retirement in 1943. Significantly, as Brandi McCarry's commentary has pointed out, Hardinge's ultimate loyalty lay with the King-in-Parliament rather than personally with a monarch in conflict (and especially when the conflict was between the Sovereign and "his" Parliament).  This was particularly reflected in Hardinge's warning letter to Edward, received on 13 November 1936, which showed evidence of prior consultation with Prime Minister Stanley Baldwin, who, with his cabinet, had serious misgivings about the suitability of Mrs Wallis Simpson as the possible spouse of the monarch. The precise nature and extent of his loyalty were thus constitutional—doing what he thought was right in his post as Private Secretary to the Sovereign. In 1940 He received the King George VI Version of the Royal Household Long and Faithful Service Medal for 20 years of service to the Royal Family.

Death and legacy
Hardinge died in 1960 and his title was inherited by his son, George.

His wife Helen wrote his biography Loyal to Three Kings, William Kimber, London 1967.

References

Further reading
 Hardinge of Penshurst, Baron (UK, 1910), genealogy
 Hardinge, Charles, first Baron Hardinge of Penshurst (1858–1944), diplomatist and viceroy of India
Hardinge's entry at Who's Who

1894 births
1960 deaths
People educated at Harrow School
Alumni of Trinity College, Cambridge
Grenadier Guards officers
British Army personnel of World War I
Barons in the Peerage of the United Kingdom
Knights Grand Cross of the Order of the Bath
Knights Grand Cross of the Royal Victorian Order
Recipients of the Military Cross
Private Secretaries to the Sovereign
Assistant Private Secretaries to the Sovereign
Abdication of Edward VIII
Members of the Privy Council of the United Kingdom
People from Penshurst